2019 general election may refer to:

Africa
 2019 Botswana general election
 2019 Guinea-Bissau legislative election
 2019 Namibian general election
 2019 Nigerian general election
 2019 Malagasy parliamentary election
 2019 Malawian general election
 2019 Mozambican general election
 2019 South African general election

Americas
 2019 Argentine general election
 2019 Bolivian general election
 2019 Canadian federal election
 2019 Dominican general election
 2019 Guatemalan general election
 2019 Guyanese general election
 2019 Panamanian general election
 2019 Uruguayan general election

Asia
 2019 Indian general election
 April 2019 Israeli legislative election
 September 2019 Israeli legislative election
 2019 Philippine general election
 2019 Thai general election

Europe
 2019 Danish general election
 2019 Portuguese legislative election
 2019 Finnish parliamentary election
 2019 Spanish general election
 2019 United Kingdom general election

Oceania
 2019 Australian federal election
 2019 Indonesian general election
 2019 Nauruan parliamentary election
 2019 Solomon Islands general election

See also
 List of elections in 2019
 2019 supranational electoral calendar
 2019 national electoral calendar
 2019 local electoral calendar